The FIFA Confederations Cup was an international association football competition established in 1992 as the King Fahd Cup and known as the FIFA Confederations Cup from 1997 to 2017. It was contested by eight men's national teams of the members of Fédération Internationale de Football Association (FIFA), the sport's global governing body, who qualified by winning their respective continental tournaments. The Confederations Cup final matches were the last of the competition, and the results determine which country's team were declared champions. If after 90 minutes of regular play the score is a draw, an additional 30-minute period of play, called extra time, was added. If such a game is still tied after extra time it is decided by kicks from the penalty mark, commonly called a penalty shoot-out. The winning penalty shoot-out team were then declared champions.

In the ten tournaments held, 33 nations have appeared at least once. Of these, thirteen made it to the final match, and six had won. With four titles, Brazil was the most successful team. The other former champions were France, with two titles, and Argentina, Denmark, Mexico and Germany with one title each. The competition was cancelled in 2019 and replaced with an expanded FIFA Club World Cup.

List of finals

 The "Year" column refers to the year the Confederations Cup tournament was held, and wikilinks to the article about that tournament.
 Links in the "Winners" and "Runners-up" columns point to the articles for the national football teams of the countries, not the articles for the countries.
 The wikilinks in the "Final score" column point to the article about that tournament's final game.

Results by nation

Results by confederation

Footnotes

References
General
 

Specific

External links
 Official website

 
FIFA Confederations Cup